The West Bengal Film Journalists' Association Award for Best Actress in a Leading Role is given yearly by WBFJA as a part of its annual West Bengal Film Journalists' Association Awards for Bengali films, to recognize the best actress of the previous year.

Superlatives

List of Winners

Winners 
{| class="wikitable"
!Year
!Winner
!FILM
!ref
|-
|2017
|Rituparna Sengupta 
|Praktan
|
|-
|2018
|Jaya Ahsan 
|Bishorjon
|
|-
| rowspan="2" |2019
|Rituparna Sengupta 
|Drishtikone
|
|-
|Sudipta chakroborty
|Uronchondi
|
|-
|2020
|Subhashree Ganguly
|Parineeta
|
|-
| 2021
| Aparajita Adhya
| Cheeni 
|-
| 2022
| Jaya Ahsan
| Binisutoy|-
|}

 Nominations 
2022
 Jaya Ahsan for Binisutoy

2021
 Aparajita Adhya for Cheeni'' Arpita Chatterjee for Abyakto
 Rituparna Sengupta for Parcel
 Swastika Mukherjee for Guldasta 
 Rukmini Mitra for Switzerland

 2020  

 Subhashree Ganguly for Parineeta Koneenica Banerjee for Mukherjee Dar Bou
 Anashua Majumdar for  Mukherjee Dar Bou
 Raima Sen for Tarikh
 Paoli Dam for Sanjhbati2019 

 Rituparna Sengupta for Drishtikone  
 Sudipta chakroborty for Uronchondi Koel Mallick for Ghore & Baire
 Jaya Seal for Alifa
 Tanuja for Shonar Pahar

 2018  

 Jaya Ahsan for Bishorjon Paoli Dam for Devi
 Swastika Mukherjee for Asamapta
 Sohini Sarkar for Durga Sohay
 Arpita Chatterjee for ChitrakPaoli Damar

 2017  

 Rituparna Sengupta for Praktan'''
 Paoli Dam in Khawto
 Swastika Mukherjee in Saheb Bibi Golam
 Gargee Roychowdhury in Beche Thakar Gan

See also 

 West Bengal Film Journalists' Association Award for Best Actor
 West Bengal Film Journalists' Association Awards
 Cinema of India

References 

Film awards for lead actress